Andrew Kelly (born 2 June 1982) is a Scottish rugby union coach who coaches Valley RFC in Hong Kong. He previously played for Edinburgh Rugby in the Pro14. He played at Hooker.

Rugby Union career

Amateur career

Kelly started his rugby career alongside former Edinburgh centre Matt Dey at Stewart’s Melville College where they won the Scottish Schools Cup in 1999.

After 10 years at Edinburgh, Andrew re-located to Hong Kong where he played for Valley RFC for 4 consecutive winning seasons.

Professional career

He represented Edinburgh at age-grade at under-16, under-18, and under-19 before playing for the senior side.

International career

Kelly has represented Scotland at under-18, under-19, and under-21 grades. His international under-19 games included starting in all four in the 2001 FIRA World Junior Championship in Santiago, Chile, and scoring a try against Japan in the final match there.

Kelly was capped at Scotland 'A' international.

Coaching career

He was appointed head coach of Valley RFC.

He is also now the assistant coach of the Hong Kong national side.

References

External links
Edinburgh Rugby profile

1982 births
Living people
Scottish rugby union coaches
Scottish rugby union players
Edinburgh Rugby players
Scottish expatriate rugby union players
Expatriate rugby union players in Hong Kong
Scottish expatriate sportspeople in Hong Kong
Scotland 'A' international rugby union players
Stewart's Melville RFC players
Valley RFC players
Rugby union hookers